Constitutional Renewal Party of Peru (in Spanish: Partido Constitucional Renovador del Perú) was a political party in Peru. It was founded in 1931 through the merger of the Constitutional Party and the National Coalition. In the 1931 presidential elections the party leader Aryro Osores was launched as a candidate.

Defunct political parties in Peru
Political parties established in 1931
Political parties with year of disestablishment missing